The Baby Snooks Show was an American radio program starring comedian and Ziegfeld Follies alumna Fanny Brice as a mischievous young girl who was 40 years younger than the actress who played her when she first went on the air. The series began on CBS September 17, 1944, airing on Sunday evenings at 6:30 pm as Post Toasties Time (for sponsor General Foods). The title soon changed to The Baby Snooks Show, and the series was sometimes called Baby Snooks and Daddy.

History
In 1904, George McManus began his comic strip, The Newlyweds, about a couple and their child, Baby Snookums. Brice began doing her Baby Snooks character in vaudeville, as she recalled in an interview shortly before her death: "I first did Snooks in 1912 when I was in vaudeville. At the time there was a juvenile actress named Baby Peggy and she was very popular. Her hair was all curled and bleached and she was always in pink or blue. She looked like a strawberry ice cream soda. When I started to do Baby Snooks, I really was a baby, because when I think about Baby Snooks it's really the way I was when I was a kid. On stage, I made Snooks a caricature of Baby Peggy."

Early on, Brice's character was sometimes called "Babykins." By 1934 she was wearing her baby costume while appearing on Broadway in the Follies show. On February 29, 1936, Brice was scheduled to appear on the Ziegfeld Follies of the Air, written and directed by Philip Rapp in 1935–37. Rapp and his writing partner David Freedman searched the closest bookcase, opened a public domain collection of sketches by Robert Jones Burdette, Chimes From a Jester’s Bells (1897), and adapted a humorous piece about a kid and his uncle, changing the boy to a girl named Snooks. Rapp continued to write the radio sketches when Brice played Snooks on the Good News Show the following year. In 1940, she became a regular character on Maxwell House Coffee Time, sharing the spotlight with actor Frank Morgan, who sometimes did a crossover into the Snooks sketches.

In 1944, the character was given her own show, and during the 1940s, it became one of the nation's favorite radio situation comedies, with a variety of sponsors (Post Cereals, Sanka, Spic-n-Span, Jell-O) being touted by a half-dozen announcers—John Conte, Tobe Reed, Harlow Willcox, Dick Joy, Don Wilson and Ken Wilson.

On screen, Brice portrayed Baby Snooks in the 1938 film Everybody Sing in a scene with Judy Garland as Little Lord Fauntleroy.

Hanley Stafford was best known for his portrayal of Snooks' long-suffering, often-cranky father, Lancelot “Daddy” Higgins, a role played earlier by Alan Reed on the 1936 Follies broadcasts. Lalive Brownell was Vera “Mommy” Higgins, portrayed by Lois Corbet (mid-1940s) and Arlene Harris (after 1945). Beginning in 1945, child impersonator Leone Ledoux was first heard as Snooks' younger brother Robespierre, and Snooks returned full circle to the comics when comic book illustrator Graham Ingels and his wife Gertrude named their son Robespierre (born 1946) after listening to Ledoux's child voice.

Danny Thomas was "daydreaming postman" Jerry Dingle (1944–45) who imagined himself in other occupations, such as a circus owner or railroad conductor. Others in the cast were Ben Alexander, Elvia Allman, Sara Berner, Charlie Cantor, Ken Christy, Earl Lee, Frank Nelson, Lillian Randolph, Alan Reed (as Mr. Weemish, Daddy's boss) and Irene Tedrow.

The scripts by Bill Danch, Sid Dorfman, Robert Fisher, Everett Freeman,  Jess Oppenheimer (later the producer and head writer of I Love Lucy), Philip Rapp (who often revised his scripts three times before airing) and Arthur Stander were produced and directed by Mann Holiner (early 1940s), Al Kaye (1944), Ted Bliss, Walter Bunker and Arthur Stander. Clark Casey and David Light handled the sound effects with music by Meredith Willson (1937–44), Carmen Dragon, and vocalist Bob Graham.

In 1945, when illness caused Brice to miss several episodes, her absence was incorporated into the show as a plot device in which top stars (including Robert Benchley, Sydney Greenstreet, Kay Kyser and Peter Lorre) took part in a prolonged search for Snooks. In the fall of 1946, the show moved to Friday nights at 8pm, continuing on CBS until May 28, 1948. On November 9, 1949, the series moved to NBC where it was heard Tuesdays at 8:30pm. Sponsored by Tums, The Baby Snooks Show continued on NBC until May 22, 1951. Two days later, Fanny Brice had a cerebral hemorrhage, and the show ended with her death at age 59.

One of the last shows in the series, "Report Card Blues" (May 1, 1951), is included in the CD set, The 60 Greatest Old-time Radio Shows of the 20th Century (1999), introduced by Walter Cronkite.

Radio historian Arthur Frank Wertheim recalls a few of the  pranks: "…planting a bees' nest at her mother's club meeting, cutting her father's fishing line into little pieces, ripping the fur off her mother's coat, inserting marbles into her father's piano and smearing glue on her baby brother."  Yet Snooks was not a mean-spirited child: "The character may have seemed a noisy one-joke idea based on Snooks driving Daddy to a screaming fit," wrote Gerald Nachman in Raised on Radio. "Yet Brice was wonderfully adept at giving voice to her irritating moppet without making Snooks obnoxious." Nachman quoted Variety critic Hobe Morrison: "Snooks was not nasty or mean, spiteful or sadistic. She was at heart a nice kid. Similarly, Daddy was harried and desperate and occasionally was driven to spanking his impish daughter. But Daddy wasn't ill-tempered or unkind with the kid. He wasn't a crab."

Brice herself was so meticulous and fanatical about the character that, according to Nachman, "she dressed in a baby-doll dress for the studio audience," and she also appeared in the costume at parades and personal appearances. She also insisted on her script being printed in extremely large type so she could avoid having to use reading glasses when on the air live. She was self-conscious about wearing glasses in front of an audience and didn't believe they fit the Snooks image. By her own admission, Brice was a lackadaisical rehearser: "I can't do a show until it's on the air, kid," she was quoted as telling her writer/producer Everett Freeman. Yet she locked in tight when the show did go on—right down to Snooks-like "squirming, squinting, mugging, jumping up and down," as comedian George Burns remembered.

Snooks proved so universally appealing that Brice and Stafford were invited to perform in character on the second installment of The Big Show, NBC's big-budget, last-ditch bid to keep classic radio variety programming alive amidst the television onslaught. Snooks tapped on hostess Tallulah Bankhead's door to ask about a career in acting, despite Daddy's telling her she already didn't have what it took. Later in the show, Snooks and Daddy appeared with fellow guest star Groucho Marx in a spoof of Marx's popular quiz-and-comedy show, You Bet Your Life.

Television
Brice and Stafford brought Baby Snooks and Daddy to television only once, an appearance on the June 12, 1950, edition of CBS-TV's Popsicle Parade of Stars. This was Fanny Brice's only appearance on television, with Baby Snooks portrayed by the adult Brice in a little girl's outfit.  Brice later admitted that the character of Baby Snooks just didn't work properly when seen.

Death
Fanny Brice died May 29, 1951, with her memoirs unfinished and with Baby Snooks due on the air that same night. The May 29 memorial broadcast, a musical tribute to Brice, ended with a short eulogy from Stafford: "We have lost a very real, a very warm, a very wonderful woman."

Books containing show scripts
Philip Rapp's The Baby Snooks Scripts, edited by Ben Ohmart (BearManor Media, 2003), contains Rapp's original radio scripts from Maxwell House Coffee Time, the Good News Show and other programs.

The Baby Snooks Scripts, volume two (BearManor Media, 2007), includes an undated script by Rapp featuring Alfred Hitchcock in the unlikely role of Snooks.

Episodes

1937
 12/30/37 Daniel in the Lion's Den

1938
 02/17/38 Telling Time And Shaving
 03/10/38 Income Tax
 03/24/38 Rehearsing A Speech
 03/31/38 At the Circus
 04/14/38 Why? Because! (With Judy Garland)
 05/05/38 Vitamins & Hiccups
 05/19/38 Beach House
 06/09/38 At the Doctors
 09/01/38 A Tisket A Tasket 
 09/22/38 Aunt Sophie Having a Baby
 10/20/38 Daddy Has An Hour to Kill 
 12/22/38 Visiting Santa Claus

1939
 01/??/39 The Man Who Came to Dinner
 01/22/39 Daddy's an Elk
 01/29/39 Daddy's Boss Comes to Dinner
 04/04/39 House Breaking
 05/05/39 Life Insurance
 05/11/39 Barking Rabbit
 05/18/39 Golf Tea
 05/25/39 Hugh What?
 06/01/39 Gone Fishing
 06/08/39 Violet Ray
 06/15/39 Living by Dyeing
 06/22/39 New Baby
 06/29/39 Jealousy
 09/07/39 Pulling Teeth
 09/14/39 At the Dentist
 09/22/39 Heat Wave
 09/28/39 Airport Meeting
 10/05/39 Mudneck
 10/26/39 Cake Writing & Abe Lincoln
 11/05/39 Barking Rabbit
 11/16/39 Rich Uncle & Slapsie Maxie
 11/23/39 Court Case
 11/30/39 Insurance Exam
 12/14/39 Psychoanalyzed
 12/21/39 Sneaky Snooks
 12/28/39 Hunting

1940
 01/04/40 Bungling Burglars
 01/11/40 Male Secretary
 01/18/40 Chemical Catastrophe
 01/25/40 Shetland Pony
 02/01/40 Family Tree
 02/08/40 Anatomy of a Robot
 02/15/40 Tax Returns
 02/22/40 The Missing Dollar
 02/29/40 Wedding Cake
 03/07/40 Baby Snooks Has Amnesia
 03/14/40 Tom Thumb
 03/21/40 Laying an Egg
 03/28/40 Baby Brother (Wants Attention)
 04/04/40 April Fools
 04/11/40 Baby Fish Story
 04/18/40 Magic
 04/25/40 Motel
 05/02/40 Auntie Septic
 05/09/40 Lies
 05/16/40 Jokes for Jack
 06/22/40 Tonsils Operation
 07/11/40 At the Beach
 07/18/40 Library Visit
 07/25/40 Port Hole Safe
 09/05/40 Magazine Scam
 09/12/40 New Car
 09/19/40 Playing Hooky
 09/26/40 Where's the Medicine?
 10/10/40 Football Game
 10/17/40 Where's My Change?
 10/24/40 Raising a Loan
 10/31/40 Ruined Suit
 11/07/40 Oil Discovered
 11/14/40 Measles
 11/21/40 4 Fathers
 11/28/40 Stolen Turkey
 12/12/40 Haunted House
 12/19/40 Christmas Skates
 12/26/40 Returning Presents

1941
 01/02/41 Sneaking Out
 01/09/41 Art Museum
 01/23/41 Flat Tire
 01/30/41 Jury Duty
 02/06/41 Flower Gardens
 02/13/41 Taxes Again
 02/27/41 At the Races
 03/20/41 Photographer
 03/27/41 Buying Shoes
 04/03/41 At the Zoo
 04/10/41 Trout Fishing
 04/17/41 Baseball Game
 04/24/41 Fixing Supper
 05/08/41 Riding Academy
 05/22/41 Insomnia
 05/29/41 Antique Auction
 06/05/41 Calisthenics
 06/12/41 X-Ray Machine
 06/19/41 Dollar Day
 06/26/41 Artist Daddy
 07/10/41 Going to Camp
 10/02/41 Snooks Returns
 10/09/41 New School
 10/23/41 Duck Hunting
 10/31/41 Halloween
 11/06/41 Defense Stamps
 11/13/41 Mixed Nuts
 11/27/41 The Opera
 12/18/41 Air Raid Warden

1942
 01/01/42 Hangover
 01/08/42 Victory Garden
 01/15/42 House Guest
 01/22/42 Hiccups
 01/29/42 Report Card
 02/05/42 Knitting Lessons
 02/12/42 Camping In
 02/26/42 Stealing Chickens
 03/19/42 Fake Measles
 03/26/42 Red Cross
 04/02/42 Easter Suit
 04/09/42 Daddy's Birthday
 04/16/42 Poultice
 04/23/42 $50.00 Raise
 04/30/42 Quiz Kids
 05/07/42 Fishing Rod
 05/14/42 Driving Home From a Wedding
 05/21/42 Sugar
 05/28/42 Abnormal Psychology
 06/04/42 10th Anniversary
 06/11/42 The Twins
 06/18/42 The Trade
 07/02/42 Baby Buggy
 09/03/42 Camp Report
 09/24/42 Matinee
 10/01/42 Gozinta
 10/08/42 Charlie
 12/03/42 Getting Gas
 12/18/42 Cinderella

1943
 01/14/43 Stolen Medal
 11/04/43 The Trial

1944
 06/15/44 The World's Most Patient Father
 12/03/44 Daddy Tries to Cure Snooks Lying

1945
 05/13/45 Live from the Bijou
 09/16/45 Snooks is Missing
 12/16/45 Baby Snooks is Lost

1946
 11/01/46 Hallowe'en Trick or Treat

1947
 03/02/47 Home Remodeling
 05/23/47 Miracle Children Quiz Show
 10/17/47 Daddy's New Suits
 10/24/47 Ugly Duckling (Snooks is Unpopular)
 (April) Charles harding blaire to arrive

1950
 11/12/50 Snooks & Tallulah

1951
 01/05/51 Daddy's Old Flame
 01/15/51 The Lady Detective
 02/18/51 Hanging Wallpaper
 03/20/51 The Easter Bonnet
 05/05/51 Report Card Blues

Notes

References
Dunning, John. On the Air: The Encyclopedia of Old-Time Radio. New York: Oxford University Press, 1998. 
Harmon, Jim. The Great Radio Comedians. Albany, Georgia: BearManor Media, 2007. 
Rapp, Philip. The Baby Snooks Scripts. Albany, Georgia: BearManor Media, 2006. 
Rapp, Philip. The Baby Snooks Scripts Vol. 2. Albany, Georgia: BearManor Media, 2007. 
Sies, Luther F. Encyclopedia of American Radio 1920–1960.  Jefferson, North Carolina: McFarland, 2000. 
Terrace, Vincent. The Radio's Golden Years: Encyclopedia of Radio Programs, 1930–1960. A. S. Barnes, 1981.

Further reading
 Rapp, Philip. The Baby Snooks Scripts. Albany, Georgia: BearManor Media, 2003. .

External links
Baby Snooks official site archived at the Wayback Machine
Fanny Brice Collection: Baby Snooks
 Robert Jones Burdette's Chimes from a Jester's Bells: "The Story of Rollo"

1930s American radio programs
1930s in comedy
1940s American radio programs
American comedy radio programs
Radio characters introduced in 1936
1944 radio programme debuts
CBS Radio programs
NBC radio programs
Female characters in radio